Noonu Atoll Education Centre is a school in N. Velidhoo Republic of Maldives. It teaches from grade 1–12.
It is the most preferred and high quality school in Noonu Atoll.

Schools in the Maldives